Valuas can refer to
 Valuas (folklore) - Folklore figures from Venlo
 Valuas (restaurant) - Michelin starred restaurant in Venlo